Fernando Casas may refer to:

Fernando de Casas Novoa, Spanish architect
Fernando Vizcaino Casas, Spanish labour lawyer and writer
Fernando Casas (singer), see 1992 Chilean telethon
Fernando Casas (physician), see Chiclana de la Frontera